Quant  is a surname. Notable people with the surname include:

 Abbie de Quant (born 1946), Dutch flautist
 Fritz Quant (1888–1933), German painter, graphic artist, and designer
 Jonas Quant (born 1973), Swedish record producer, songwriter, and remixer
 Mary Quant (born 1930), English fashion designer and fashion icon